Halieutopsis margaretae, also known as Margaret's deepsea batfish, is a species of fish in the family Ogcocephalidae.

It is found in the Northwestern Central Pacific Ocean including Japan, Taiwan and Hawaii.

Etymology
The fish is named in honor of Professor. Margaret G. Bradbury.

References

Ogcocephalidae
Marine fish genera
Fish described in 2007
Taxa named by Hans Hsuan-Ching Ho
Taxa named by Shao Kwang-Tsao